The Italian edible frog (Pelophylax kl. hispanicus) is a hybridogenic species in the true frog family Ranidae. These frogs are the offspring of P. bergeri and either P. ridibundus or the edible frog (P. kl.  esculentus) which is itself of hybrid origin.

It is endemic to Italy; despite the specific name hispanicus (Latin for "the Spanish one"), it does not occur in Spain. Its natural habitats are rivers, intermittent rivers, swamps, freshwater lakes, intermittent freshwater lakes, freshwater marshes, and intermittent freshwater marshes. It is not considered threatened by the IUCN.

See also 
 Hybridogenesis in water frogs

References
 Andreone, F. 2004.  Pelophylax hispanicus.   2006 IUCN Red List of Threatened Species.   Downloaded on 23 July 2007.

Pelophylax
Amphibia hybrids
Amphibians of Europe
Endemic fauna of Italy
Amphibians described in 1839
Taxa named by Charles Lucien Bonaparte
Taxonomy articles created by Polbot